FC Veris was a Moldovan football club based in Chișinău, Moldova. They played in the Moldovan "B" Division, the third division in Moldovan football. In 2012, FC Veris won Divizia B, and were promoted. They won their first season in the Moldovan "A" Division and gained promotion to the highest tier of football in Moldova which is the Moldovan National Division. Veris played one and a half season in the top division before withdrawing in December 2014.

History
In spring 2011, youths from the village Drăgăneşti, Singerei, petitioned the businessman Vladimir Niculae with a request to create a football club, to attend district championship. 

On 5 December 2014, Veris withdrew from all competitions after a 1–0 loss against Sheriff Tiraspol in the Moldovan Cup. The president of the club was dissatisfied with the refereeing in the match, as he felt Veris should have been given at least two penalties. The club was in first place in the Moldovan National Division at the time of the withdrawal.

Kit manufacturers and shirt sponsors

Past seasons

European record

Notes
 1Q: First qualifying round

Honours
Moldovan Cup
 Runners-up: 2012–13

Divizia A
 Winners: 2012–13

Divizia B
 Winners: 2011–12

Managers
 Igor Ursachi (July 1, 2011 – May 4, 2012)
 Dănuț Oprea (Jan 12, 2013 – Oct 28, 2013)
 Igor Dobrovolski (Oct 30, 2013 – March 9, 2014)
 Lilian Popescu (March 10, 2014 – Dec 5, 2014)

References

External links
Official website
FC Veris on Soccerway.com

Football clubs in Moldova
Veris
Association football clubs established in 2011
FC Veris
Association football clubs disestablished in 2014
Defunct football clubs in Moldova